LTG or ltg may refer to:

 Latgalian language (ISO 639-3 language code)
 Lieutenant general
 Limits to Growth, Club of Rome
 Linda Thomas-Greenfield (born 1952), United States Ambassador to the United Nations
 Lithuanian Railways